Pharsalia cameronhighlandica is a species of beetle in the family Cerambycidae. It was described by Masao Hayashi in 1975.

References

cameronhighlandica
Beetles described in 1975